This is a list of the chapters and volumes of the seinen manga series Futari Ecchi by Katsu Aki. The series premiered in Young Animal in January 1997, where it is still on-going. The individual chapters are collected and published in tankōbon volumes by Hakusensha, with the first volume released in August 1997. Many of the chapters are stand-alone pieces, enabling them to be read in any order. As such, they are often rearranged when published in the volume releases. In addition to the main chapters, the series has extra unnumbered chapters called "Specials." Some of these extra chapters have been serialized in Young Animal, but the majority have been released in a sister publication Young Animal Arashi.

As of January 2023, 88 volumes have been published in Japan. In December 2002, a side story called Futari Ecchi for Ladies began serialization in Silky, running for twelve chapters until its conclusion in October 2004. The individual chapters were collected and published in two tankōbon volumes by Hakusensha. Another side story titled  ran in Young Animal in 2017 and was compiled into one volume.

Tokyopop licensed Futari Ecchi for an English language release in North America under the name Manga Sutra - Futari H in 2008, with two volumes of the original Japanese release combined into a single volume for the Tokyopop release. The first of these combined volumes was released January 8, 2008. Tokyopop ceased all manga publishing in 2011, leaving only four volumes having been released, comprising eight of the Japanese volumes. Futari Ecchi is also licensed for release in France by Pika Édition, with 50 volumes released before the cancellation of the series.

Volume list

Futari Ecchi For Ladies

Futari Ecchi Gaiden: Akira, The Evangelist of Sex

References
General
 

Specific

Futari Ecchi